Jean-Jacques Aillagon (born 2 October 1946, Metz) is a French politician, a close confidant of Jacques Chirac and member of the Union for a Popular Movement (UMP) political party.  From 1972 to 1976 he was a high school teacher in the Corrèze region of France.  From 1982 to 2002 he was an administrator and eventually Chairman of the Centre Georges Pompidou in Paris.

He became Minister of Culture and Communication in Jean-Pierre Raffarin's national government from 2002 to 2004.  In 2005 he was elected CEO of the worldwide satellite television station TV5MONDE.

By the decree of 6 June 2007, he was appointed President of the Château de Versailles (Etablissement public du musée et du domaine national de Versailles) (Journal Officiel n°01310 dated 07/06/2007). He is also a member of The Conseil Économique et Social (Economic and Social Council), France's third most important constitutional assembly. Jean-Jacques Aillagon is a close confidant of François Pinault.

Aillagon is openly gay.

Biography

2005: Elected CEO of TV5MONDE, the fourth largest global television network available around the world after the BBC, CNN and MTV.
2002-2004 : Jean-Jacques Aillagon was appointed Minister for Culture and Communication  on 7 May 2002.
2002: Renewal, by the Decree of 7 March 2002, of his appointment as Chairman of the Georges Pompidou National Centre of Art and Culture
1999: Renewal, by the Decree of 26 March 1999, of his appointment as Chairman of the Georges Pompidou National Centre of Art and Culture
1996: Appointed, by the Decree of 17 December 1996, Chairman of Mission 2000 in France. Tasked by the Prime Minister with reflecting on the organization of France's celebration of the start of the third millennium
Appointed, by the Decree of 28 March 1996, Chairman of the Georges Pompidou National Centre of Art and Culture
1995: In overall charge of organizing "France-Egypt Year" (1997–1998)
Elected Chairman of the Association of Cultural Affairs Directors of France's major cities
1993: City of Paris' Cultural Affairs Director
1992: Managing Director of the Paris Vidéothèque [video library]
1990: Coordinator of the celebrations marking the centenary of General de Gaulle's birth
1988: Head of the City of Paris' cultural events department
1985: Deputy Director of Cultural Affairs of the City of Paris, and Director of the Cultural Information Office
1982: Trustee of the National Museum of Modern Art at the Georges Pompidou Centre
1981: Assistant Director of the École nationale supérieure des Beaux-Arts, responsible for the Institution's cultural and scientific programme
1978: Head of the External Relations and Exhibitions Department at the École nationale supérieure des Beaux-Arts
1977: Head of the Architectural Archives Department at the École nationale supérieure des Beaux-Arts
1976: On secondment to the Ministry of Culture. Researcher at the Architectural Studies and Research Centre
1973-1976: Teacher at Egletons and Tulle lycées (Corrèze).

References

Further reading
 AILLAGON, Jean Jacques International Who's Who. accessed September 1, 2006.

1946 births
Living people
French Ministers of Culture
Gay politicians
LGBT conservatism
French LGBT politicians
Politicians of the French Fifth Republic
Politicians from Metz
Officiers of the Légion d'honneur
Officers of the Ordre national du Mérite
University of Paris alumni